Sama Beirut is a residential, commercial and office tower in the Sodeco region of Beirut, Lebanon. The project was announced on August 13, 2009 and was opened in 2016. Fadi Antonios developed the project, and it is owned by his company, Antonios Projects SAL.

See also
List of tallest buildings in Lebanon

References

External links
Official announcement of Sama Beirut
Official website of Sama Beirut

Buildings and structures in Beirut
Buildings and structures under construction in Lebanon